NMSL may refer to:
National Maximum Speed Law, a speed limit applied throughout the United States between 1974 and 1995
NMSL, used as an insult, a Chinese Internet slang